This is a list of existing articles related to fashion and clothing.
For individual designers, see List of fashion designers

0–9 

 1100–1200 in European fashion
 1200–1300 in European fashion
 1300–1400 in European fashion
 1400–1500 in European fashion
 1500–50 in Western European fashion
 1550–1600 in Western European fashion
 1600–50 in Western European fashion
 1650–1700 in Western European fashion
 1700–50 in Western fashion
 1750–75 in Western fashion
 1775–95 in Western fashion
 1795–1820 in Western fashion
 1820s in Western fashion
 1830s in Western fashion
 1840s in Western fashion
 1850s in Western fashion
 1860s in Western fashion
 1870s in Western fashion
 1880s in Western fashion
 1890s in Western fashion
 1900s in fashion
 1910s in Western fashion
 1920s in Western fashion
 1930–45 in fashion
 1945–60 in fashion
 1960s in fashion
 1970s in fashion
 1980s in fashion
 1990s in fashion
 2000–09 in fashion
 2010s in fashion

A 

 A-2 jacket
 A-line (clothing)
 Abacá
 Abaca slippers
 Abacost
 Abaniko
 Abarka
 Abaya
 Abolla
 Aboyne dress
 Academic dress
 Academic scarf
 Academic stole
 Achkan
 Acid dye
 Acrylic fiber
 Adaptive clothing
 Adjustable-focus eyeglasses
 Adornment
 Afghan (blanket)
 Afghan Coat
 Afghanka
 African textiles
 Afro
 Afterwear
 Agal (accessory)
 Aglet
 Aguayo (cloth)
 Aida cloth
 Aigrette
 Aiguillette
 Aiguillette (ornament)
 Aikidogi
 Ajrak
 Alasho
 Alb
 Albanian hat
 Alençon lace
 Alice in Wonderland dress
 All over print
 Aloha shirt
 Alpaca fiber
 Altdeutsche Tracht
 Amauti
 Amice
 Ammunition boot
 Anglo-Saxon dress
 Angora wool
 Angusticlavia
 Animal print
 Anklet (sock)
 Annie Hall
 Anorak
 Anthony Eden hat
 Antique satin
 Antistatic garments
 Antwerp lace
 Áo bà ba
 Ao dai
 Áo gấm
 Áo tứ thân
 Apex (headdress)
 Apostolnik
 Appliqué
 Appliqué lace
 Approach shoe
 Apron
 Araimudi
 Aran jumper
 Arch support
 Archducal hat
 Architectonic jewellery
 Argentan lace
 Argyle (pattern)
 Arkhalig
 Arm ring
 Arm warmer
 Armenian dress
 Armet
 Armscye
 Art jewelry
 Artificial hair integrations
 Artificial leather
 Ascot cap
 Ascot tie
 Aso Oke fabric
 Aso Oke hat
 Assam silk
 Asymmetric cut
 Assyrian clothing
 Athletic shoe
 Atilla (clothing)
 Attic helmet
 Attifet
 Australian Aboriginal fibrecraft
 Australian Fashion Week
 Australian work boot
 Av Pak
 Avarca (shoe)
 Ave Maria lace
 Aventail
 Aviator hat
 Away colours
 Ayam (cap)
 Aztec clothing

B 
 
 Baby sling
 Babydoll
 Back closure
 Backcombing
 Backless dress
 Backpack
 Baggies (clothing)
 Baggy green
 Bahag (garment)
 Baja Jacket
 Baji (clothing)
 Baju Kurung
 Baju Melayu
 Bakhu
 Bakya
 Balaclava (clothing)
 Baldness
 Baldric(k)
 Balgha
 Ball dress
 Ball gown
 Ballerina neckline
 Ballerina skirt
 Ballet boot
 Ballet flat
 Ballet shoe
 Ballet tutu
 Ballistic vest
 Balmoral bonnet
 Baluchar Sari
 Bamboo
 Banarasi sari
 Banbi
 Band collar
 Bandeau
 Bandhani
 Bandolier
 Bands (neckwear)
 Bangle
 Banyan (clothing)
 Baptismal clothing
 Bar tack
 Barathea
 Barbute
 Baro't saya
 Barong Tagalog
 Barretina
 Barrette
 Bascinet
 Baseball cap
 Baseball glove
 Baseball uniform
 Bases (fashion)
 Bashlyk
 Basque (clothing)
 Bast fibre
 Bast shoe
 Bathing dress
 Bathrobe
 Batik
 Batiste
 Batsuit
 Battenberg lace
 Batting glove
 Batting helmet
 Battle Dress
 Battle jacket
 Battledress
 Bead
 Bead crochet
 Beadwork
 Beanie (North America)
 Bearskin
 Beatle boot
 Beaver hat
 Beca (garment)
 Bed jacket
 Bedgown
 Bedford cord
 Beetlewing
 Beetling
 Beizi
 Bekishe
 Bell sleeve
 Bell-bottoms
 Bell-boy hat
 Bell-boy jacket
 Belly chain
 Belt (clothing)
 Belt buckle
 Belt hook
 Belted plaid
 Bench shirt
 Beonggeoji
 Beoseon
 Beret
 Bergère hat
 Berlin Iron Jewellery
 Bermuda shorts
 Bernos
 Bespoke
 Bhaad-gaaule
 Bias (textile)
 Bib (garment)
 Biblical clothing
 Biblical sandals
 Bicorne
 Big hair
 Bikini
 Bikini variants
 Bilum
 Binche lace
 Bindi (decoration)
 Bindle
 Binyeo
 Biretta
 Birkenstock
 Birkin bag
 Birrus
 Bishop Andrewes cap
 Bisht (clothing)
 Black beret
 Black cap
 Black tie
 Blackwork
 Blangkon
 Blanket sleeper
 Blanket stitch
 Blaze of Sweden
 Blazer
 Bling-bling
 Blonde lace
 Bloomers (clothing)
 Blouse
 Blouson
 Blucher shoe
 Bluecoat
 Boardshorts
 Boar's tusk helmet
 Boat neck
 Boat shoes
 Boater
 Bob cut
 Bobbin lace
 Bobble hat
 Bobby pin
 Bobby sock
 Bobby soxer
 Bògòlanfini
 Bodice
 Body modification
 Bodystocking
 Bodysuit
 Boeotian helmet
 Bokgeon
 Bolo tie
 Bondage pants
 Bondage corset
 Bone (corsetry)
 Bone lace
 Bonnet (headgear)
 Book bag
 Boonie hat
 Boot
 Boot fetishism
 Boot jack
 Boot socks
 Bootee
 Boothose
 Boshiya
 Boss of the Plains
 Boston Fashion Week
 Boubou (clothing)
 Bouclé
 Bouffant
 Bouffant gown
 Boutonnière
 Bow tie
 Bowler hat
 Bowling shirt
 Bowyangs
 Boxer briefs
 Boxer shorts
 Boxing glove
 Boyar hat
 Boyfriend (fashion)
 Braccae
 Bracteate
 Braid
 Braiding machine
 Braies
 Brassard
 Bra
 Brassiere measurement
 Brazilian Jiu-Jitsu gi
 Breathability
 Breechcloth
 Breeches
 Breeching (boys)
 Breeks
 Brez (clothing)
 Briefcase
 Briefs
 Brigandine
 Bristle
 British Fashion Awards
 British Fashion Council
 British Inspiration Awards
 Broadcloth
 Brocade
 Broderie Anglaise
 Brogan (shoes)
 Brogue shoe
 Brooch
 Broomstick lace
 Brothel creeper
 Browline glasses
 Brunswick (clothing)
 Brussels lace
 Bucket hat
 Buckle
 Buckram
 Bucks point lace
 Buckskin (leather)
 Buckskins
 Budenovka
 Buff coat
 Buffalo coat
 Buka cloak
 Bun (hairstyle)
 Bunad
 Bunny boots
 Bunny slippers
 Burgonet
 Burka (Caucasus)
 Burnout (clothing)
 Burnous
 Burqa
 Burqini
 Busby
 Business casual
 Busk
 Buskin
 Bustier
 Bustle
 Bustle (regalia)
 Button
 Button blanket
 Buttonhole
 Buyer (fashion)
 Buzz cut
 BWH
 Bycocket
 Byssus
 Byzantine chain
 Byzantine dress
 Byzantine silk

C 

 Cabbage-tree hat
 Cable knitting
 Cache-cœur
 Cache-sexe
 Cagoule
 Calendering
 Calfskin
 Calico (textile)
 Caligae
 Camauro
 Cambric
 Camel hair
 Camisa blouse
 Camisole
 Camlet
 Camocas
 Camp shirt
 Campaign hat
 Can-can dress
 Canadian military fur wedge cap
 Candlewicking
 Canepin
 Canezou
 Canterbury cap
 Canvas
 Cap
 Cap (sport)
 Cap badge
 Cap of Maintenance
 Capalana
 Cape
 Capeline
 Capirote
 Capotain
 Cappello Alpino
 Cappello romano
 Capri pants
 Capuchon
 Caraco
 Card enclosure
 Cardigan (sweater)
 Carding
 Cargo pants
 Carmagnole
 Carpenter jeans
 Carpet bag
 Capsule wardrobe
 Carrickmacross lace
 Cashmere wool
 Casquette
 Casquette d'Afrique
 Cassock
 Casual attire
 Casual Friday
 Casual (subculture)
 Cat eye glasses
 Catholic school uniform
 Catsuit
 Caubeen
 Caul (headgear)
 Caulk boots
 Cavalier boots
 Cavalier hat
 Cellulose
 Celtic brooch
 Ceremonial clothing in Western cultures
 Ceremonial dress
 Cervelliere
 Cestus
 Chador
 Chalcidian helmet
 Chamanto
 Chamois leather
 Championship belt
 Chang kben
 Chang'ao
 Changshan
 Chantilly lace
 Chap boot
 Chapan
 Chapatsu
 Chapeau
 Chaperon (headgear)
 Chaplet (headgear)
 Chaps
 Charm bracelet
 Charmeuse
 Chastity belt
 Chasuble
 Chatelaine (chain)
 Chausses
 Che Guevara in fashion
 Cheerleading uniform
 Cheesecloth
 Chef's uniform
 Chelsea boot
 Chemise
 Chemise cagoule
 Chemisette
 Chenille fabric
 Cheongsam
 Cheopji
 Chesterfield coat
 Chic (style)
 Chicken suit
 Chiffon (clothing)
 Chiffon (fabric)
 Chignon (hairstyle)
 Chikan (embroidery)
 Children's clothing
 Chilote cap
 Chilote poncho
 Chima (clothing)
 Chima jeogori
 Chimere
 Chinese academic dress
 Chinese clothing
 Chino cloth
 Chintz
 Chiton (costume)
 Chlamys
 Choga (garment)
 Choir dress
 Choker
 Chokha
 Choli
 Choora
 Chopine
 Christian clothing
 Christian headcovering
 Chuba
 Chugha
 Chukka boot
 Chullo
 Chupalla
 Churidar
 Cieszyn folk costume
 Cilice
 Cincture
 Circlet
 Clear heels
 Cleat (shoe)
 Cleavage (breasts)
 Cleavage enhancement
 Clerical clothing
 Clerical collar
 Climbing shoe
 Clip-on tie
 Cloak
 Cloche hat
 Close-bodied gown
 Close helm
 Close helmet
 Clothing fetish
 Clothing in Africa
 Clothing in ancient Egypt
 Clothing in ancient Greece
 Clothing in ancient Rome
 Clothing in India
 Clothing in Mauritius
 Clothing in the ancient world
 Clothing in the Ragtime Era
 Clothing insulation
 Clothing laws by country
 Clothing material
 Clothing sizes
 Clothing technology
 Clothing terminology
 Clog (British)
 Clog (shoe)
 Clubwear
 Clutch (pin fastener)
 Coat (clothing)
 Coat pocket
 Cockade
 Cockernonnie
 Cocktail dress
 Cocktail hat
 Coconut jewelry
 Codpiece
 Coif
 Coin purse
 Cointoise
 Coir
 Collar (BDSM)
 Collar (clothing)
 Collar (jewelry)
 Collar pin
 Collar stays
 Colobium sindonis
 Colour fastness
 Coloured hat
 Combat boot
 Combing
 Compression garment
 Compression shorts
 Compression sportswear
 Compression stockings
 Concert T-shirt
 Conical Asian hat
 Contemporary Western wedding dress
 Cooling vest
 Coolus helmet
 Coonskin cap
 Cooper A-2 jacket
 Cope
 Coppola (cap)
 Çorape
 Copyright law of fashion design
 Corduroy
 Cork hat
 Corinthian helmet
 Cornette
 Cornrows
 Corolla (headgear)
 Coronet
 Corsage
 Corsage (bodice)
 Corselet
 Corset
 Corslet
 Cosmetics
 Cosmetics in Ancient Rome
 Cosmetics in the 1920s
 Cosplay
 Costume
 Costume de rigueur
 Costume jewelry
 Cotton
 Cotton duck
 Coty Award
 Council of Fashion Designers of America
 Court dress
 Court shoe
 Court uniform and dress
 Courtepy
 Coutil
 Couturier
 Cowboy boot
 Cowboy hat
 Cowhide
 Cowichan knitting
 Cowl
 Crakow (shoe)
 Crape
 Cravat
 Cretonne
 Crew cut
 Crew neck
 Crew sock
 Cricket cap
 Cricket whites
 Crinoline
 Croatian national costume
 Crochet
 Crochet thread
 Crocheted lace
 Crop (hairstyle)
 Crop top
 Cross country running shoes
 Cross necklace
 Crown (headgear)
 Cruise collection
 Cuban heel
 Cuff
 Cufflink
 Culottes
 Cummerbund
 Cuprammonium rayon
 Custodian helmet
 Cut and sew
 Cut-off
 Cut-resistant gloves
 Cycling glove
 Cycling shoe
 Cycling shorts
 Czapka

D 
 
 Daenggi
 Dalmatic
 Damask
 Dance belt
 Dandy
 Dangui
 Daopao
 Dark adaptor goggles
 Dart (sewing)
 Dashiki
 Dastar
 Daura-Suruwal
 Daxiushan
 Débutante dress
 Décolletage
 Deel (clothing)
 Deely bobber
 Deerskin trade
 Deerstalker
 Delia (clothing)
 Delphos gown
 Denim
 Denim skirt
 Denison smock
 Dép lốp
 Derby shoe
 Designer clothing
 Designer label
 Desizing
 Detachable collar
 Deubré
 Devilock
 Devoré
 Dhaka topi
 Dhakai
 Dhoti
 Diabetic sock
 Diadem
 Diaper
 Diaper bag
 Dickey (garment)
 Dillybag
 Dimity
 Diplomatic uniform
 Dirndl
 Disruptive Pattern Combat Uniform
 Disruptive Pattern Material
 Ditto suit
 Diving suit
 Diyi
 Djellaba
 Do-rag
 Dobok
 Doctoral hat
 Dolly Varden (costume)
 Dolman
 Dolphin shorts
 Domino mask
 Donegal tweed
 Donkey jacket
 Doobon coat
 Dopo (clothing)
 Dopp kit
 Doppa
 Dotted Swiss (Fabric)
 Double cloth
 Double-breasted
 Double knitting
 Doublet (clothing)
 Down feather
 Drag (clothing)
 Drape suit
 Draped garment
 Drapery
 Drawstring
 Dreadlocks
 Dress
 Dress boot
 Dress code
 Dress code (Western)
 Dress of the Year
 Dress pants
 Dress shirt
 Dress shoe
 Dress socks
 Dress uniform
 Driglam namzha
 Drill (fabric)
 Driving glove
 Driving moccasins
 Driza-Bone
 Duffel bag
 Duffle coat
 Dumalla
 Dumdyam
 Dumpra
 Dunce cap
 Dupatta
 Dupioni
 Durumagi
 Dush-toh
 Duster (clothing)
 Dutch cap
 Dutch Fashion Awards
 Duty armband
 Dwikkoji
 Dye
 Dyeing

E 
 
 E-textiles
 Early medieval European dress
 Earmuffs
 Earring
 Easter bonnet
 Earth shoe
 Edible underwear
 Eisenhower jacket
 Elastomer
 Electric jacket
 Elevator shoes
 Elle Style Awards
 Embroidery
 Empire silhouette
 EN 13402
 End-on-end
 Energy dome
 Engageante
 Engineer boot
 English medieval clothing
 Engolpion
 Epanokamelavkion
 Epaulette
 Ephod
 Epigonation
 Epimanikia
 Episcopal sandals
 Epitrachil
 Equestrian helmet
 Eri silk
 Espadrille
 Ethiopian coffee dress
 Ethiopian suit
 Eton crop
 Etruscan jewelry
 Eunjangdo
 Evening glove
 Evening gown
 Exerlopers
 Exomis
 Extraocular implant
 Extreme environment clothing
 Eyelet
 Eyepatch

F 
 
 Facekini
 Facing (sewing)
 Facing colour
 Faggoting (knitting)
 Fáinne
 Fair Isle (technique)
 Fake fur
 Falling buffe
 Falsies
 Faluche
 Fanny pack
 Faroese shawl
 Farshi Pajama
 Farthingale
 Fascia (vestment)
 Fascinator
 Fashion
 Fashion accessory
 Fashion cigarettes
 Fashion capital
 Fashion doll
 Fashion entrepreneur
 Fashion forecasting
 Fashion in the United States
 Fashion law
 Fashion matrix
 Fashion merchandising
 Fashion museum
 Fashion plate
 Fashion week
 Fast fashion
 Feather boa
 Feather bonnet
 Feather cloak
 Feather tights
 Featherstitch
 Fedora
 Felt
 Ferreruolo
 Fetish fashion
 Fez (hat)
 Fiber
 Fibroin
 Fibula (brooch)
 Fichu
 Field sign
 Filet crochet
 Filet lace
 Fillet (clothing)
 Finding
 Finger wave
 Fishnet
 Flak jacket
 Flame retardant
 Flamenco shoes
 Flannel
 Flannel vest
 Flapper
 Flax
 Flight jacket
 Flight suit
 Flip-flops
 Flipsters
 Floating canvas
 Flocking (texture)
 Flogger (fashion)
 Fly (clothing)
 Fly plaid
 Focale
 Fofudja
 Folk costume
 Fontange
 Foot binding
 Football boot
 Footwraps
 Forage cap
 Form-fitting garment
 Formal Thai national costume
 Formal trousers
 Formal wear
 Foulard
 Foundation (cosmetics)
 Foundation garment
 Four-in-hand knot
 Four Winds hat
 Fouta towels
 Freezy Freakies
 French braid
 French hood
 French knickers
 French twist (hairstyle)
 Friendship bracelet
 Frieze (textile)
 Fringe (hair)
 Fringe (trim)
 Frock
 Frock coat
 Frog (fastening)
 Fruit hat
 Fuck-me shoes
 Full dress
 Full plaid
 Fulling
 Fully fashioned stockings
 Fundoshi
 Furisode
 Fur
 Fur clothing
 Fursuit
 Fustanella
 Fustian

G 
 
 G-1 military flight jacket
 G-string
 Gabardine
 Gaberdine
 Gable hood
 Gache
 Gagra choli
 Gaiters
 Gajra
 Gákti
 Galea (helmet)
 Galero
 Galesh
 Galloon
 Galoshes
 Gambeson
 Gamine
 Gamosa
 Gamsbart
 Gamucha
 Gamurra
 Gandhi cap
 Ganguro
 Ganse cord
 Garibaldi shirt
 Garot
 Gartel
 Garter (stockings)
 Gat (hat)
 Gather (sewing)
 Gauge (knitting)
 Gaung baung
 Gauntlet (glove)
 Gauze
 Gel bracelet
 Geneva gown
 Genital jewellery
 Geodeulji
 Georgette (fabric)
 Geotextiles
 Geta (footwear)
 Geumbak
 Ghanaian smock
 Gharara
 Ghillie shirt
 Ghillie suit
 Ghillies (dance)
 Gho
 Għonnella
 Ghoonghat
 Ghost shirt
 Ghungroo
 GI glasses
 Gilet
 Gimp (thread)
 Gingham
 Girdle
 Girdle book
 Girl boxers
 Giveh
 Gladstone bag
 Glamour (presentation)
 Glass fiber
 Glasses
 Glen plaid
 Glengarry
 Glossary of dyeing terms
 Glossary of sewing terms
 Glossary of textile manufacturing
 Glossary of textile terminology
 Glove
 Glove (ice hockey)
 Go-go boot
 Goatskin (material)
 Godet (sewing)
 Goggle jacket
 Goggles
 Going commando
 Gold-filled jewelry
 Golden hat
 Gomesi
 Gomusin
 Gonryongpo
 Gook (headgear)
 Gore (segment)
 Gore-Tex
 Gorget
 Gota Work
 Gothic fashion
 Gown
 Gowni
 Grameen Check
 Grandfather shirt
 Granny square
 Grass skirt
 Greatcoat
 Great helm
 Grecian bend
 Greek Army uniforms
 Greek fisherman's cap
 Green beret
 Green eyeshade
 Green jersey
 Grenadine (cloth)
 Grill (jewelry)
 Grommet
 Grosgrain
 Grotulja
 Guayabera
 Guernsey (clothing)
 Gugel
 Guimpe
 Gulle
 Gusset
 Gwanbok
 Gyaru
 Gymnasterka
 Gymslip

H 

 Haapsalu shawl
 Habesha kemis
 Hachimaki
 Hackle
 Hadagi
 Haferlschuh
 Hair crimping
 Hair drop
 Hair jewellery
 Hair stick
 Hair tie
 Hairnet
 Hairpin (fashion)
 Hairpin lace
 Hakama
 Half-Windsor knot
 Halterneck
 Hammer pants
 Han Chinese clothing
 Hanbok
 Hand knitting
 Handbag
 Handkerchief
 Handkerchief skirt
 Hanfu movement
 Hangaroc
 Hanten
 Happi
 Haramaki (clothing)
 Hard hat
 Hardee hat
 Harem pants
 Harrington jacket
 Harris tweed
 Hat
 Hat Act
 Hat tax
 Hatpin
 Hatstand
 Hauberk
 Haute couture
 Haversack
 Head tie
 Headband
 Headgear
 Headgear (martial arts)
 Headpiece
 Headscarf
 Heated clothing
 Heather (fabric)
 Heel (shoe)
 Heelys
 Hejazi turban
 Helmet
 Helmet (cricket)
 Hem
 Hemline
 Hemline index
 Hemp
 Hemp jewelry
 Henley shirt
 Hennin
 Herringbone (cloth)
 Hessian (boot)
 High-low skirt
 High-technology swimwear fabric
 High-top
 High-visibility clothing
 Highland dress
 Hijab
 Hijab by country
 Hiking boot
 Himation
 Hime cut
 Hip and buttock padding
 Hip boot
 Hip-hop fashion
 Hip-huggers
 History of brassieres
 History of clothing and textiles
 History of corsets
 History of jewelry in Ukraine
 History of knitting
 History of silk
 History of suits
 History of the bikini
 History of the kilt
 Hnyat-phanat
 Hobble skirt
 Hobnail
 Hobo bag
 Hockey helmet
 Hockey pants
 Hogeon
 Holbeinesque jewellery
 Hold-ups
 Holdall
 Holland cloth
 Homburg (hat)
 Hōmongi
 Honeycomb
 Hongreline
 Honiton lace
 Hood (headgear)
 Hoodie
 Hook-and-eye closure
 Hoop skirt
 Horn-rimmed glasses
 Horned helmet
 Horsehair
 Hose (clothing)
 Hosiery
 Houndstooth
 Hounskull
 Houppelande
 Hourglass corset
 Hoxton knot
 Huarache (running shoe)
 Huarache (shoe)
 Huipil
 Humeral veil
 Hwa
 Hwagwan
 Hwarot
 Hypercolor

I 

 Ice skate
 Icelandic national costume
 Icelandic tail-cap
 Ihram clothing
 Ikat
 Ilkal saree
 Illyrian type helmet
 Imperial helmet
 Imperial Japanese Army Uniforms
 Imperial yellow jacket
 Inline skate
 Insolia
 Indian wedding clothes
 Indigo dye
 Indo-Western clothing
 Infant bodysuit
 Infant's binder
 Informal attire
 Intarsia (knitting)
 Interfacing
 International Best Dressed List
 Inverness cape
 Inverness coat
 Irish clothing
 Irish lace
 Irish linen
 Iron-on
 It Bag
 Italian charm bracelet
 Isiagu
 Islam and clothing
 Islamic dress in Europe
 Izaar

J 

 Jaapi
 Jabot (neckwear)
 Jackboot
 Jacket
 Jacket lapel
 Jacquard
 Jamavar
 Jamdani
 Jangot
 Japanese armour
 Japanese clothing
 Japanese school uniform
 Jazerant
 Jazz shoe
 Jeans
 Jeep cap
 Jeggings
 Jelebiya
 Jelick
 Jellabiya
 Jelly shoes
 Jeogori
 Jeonbok
 Jeongjagwan
 Jerkin (garment)
 Jersey (clothing)
 Jersey (fabric)
 Jet (lignite)
 Jewellery
 Jewellery in the Pacific
 Jewelry design
 Jewish hat
 Jewish religious clothing
 Jilbāb
 Jika-tabi
 Jinbei
 Jingle dress
 Jipsin
 Jobawi
 Jockstrap
 Jodhpur boot
 Jodhpuri
 Jodhpurs
 Jōe
 Jokduri
 Jorabs
 Jubba
 Judogi
 Jujutsugi
 Juliet cap
 Jump boot
 Jump smock
 Jumper (dress)
 Jumpsuit
 Jūnihitoe
 Jupe (jacket)
 Jussishirt
 Justacorps
 Jute
 Jutti

K 

 Kabney
 Kacchera
 Kaftan
 Kalaghai
 Kalamkari
 Kalimavkion
 Kamleika
 Kanchipuram Sari
 Kanga (African garment)
 Kantha
 Kanthi Mala
 Kanzashi
 Kalpak
 Kanzu
 Kapa
 Kappōgi
 Karakul (hat)
 Karate belts
 Karate gi
 Kariba suit
 Kariyushi shirt
 Kaross
 Karvalakki
 Kasa (hat)
 Kasaya (clothing)
 Kashket
 Kasket
 Kasta sari
 Kasuti
 Kate-bukuro
 Kate Middleton effect
 Kausia
 Kebaya
 Keffiyeh
 Kegelhelm
 Keikogi
 Kemp (wool)
 Kente cloth
 Kepi
 Kerchief
 Kerseymere
 Kesh (Sikhism)
 Keski
 Kettle hat
 Khādī
 Khaki
 Khaki drill
 Khalat
 Khăn rằn
 Khandua
 Khara Dupatta
 Khata
 Khmer clothing
 Kho (costume)
 Kiahan (kyahan)
 Kidan Habesha
 Kidney belt
 Kiekie (clothing)
 Kijōka-bashōfu
 Kilt
 Kilt accessories
 Kilt pin
 Kimono
 Kiondo
 Kippah
 Kipper tie
 Kira (Bhutan)
 Kirtle
 Kirza
 Kitenge
 Kittel
 Kitten heel
 Kitty Foyle (dress)
 Kkachi durumagi
 Klomp
 Klobuk
 Knee-high boot
 Knee highs
 Knickerbockers (clothing)
 Knitted fabric
 Knitting
 Knochensack
 Kofia (hat)
 Kokoshnik
 Kolhapuri chappal
 Kolpik
 Kolpos
 Konos (helmet)
 Kontusz
 Korean school uniform
 Kosa silk
 Kosode
 Kosovorotka
 Kota Doria
 Koteka
 Koto (traditional clothing)
 Koukoulion
 Kowpeenam
 Kozhukh
 Kozhushanka
 Krama
 Kroje
 Kubi bukuro
 Kufi
 Kumihimo
 Kumkum
 Kundan
 Kupiah
 Kurdish clothing
 Kurta
 Kurtka
 Kuta (clothing)
 Kuthampully Saree

L 

 Lace
 Lace wig
 Lacrosse glove
 Lamba (garment)
 Lambswool
 Lamé (fabric)
 Langa oni
 Langota
 Lap-lap
 Lapel pin
 Lappet
 Late Roman ridge helmet
 Latex clothing
 Laticlave
 Laundry
 Laundry symbol
 Laurel wreath
 Lava-lava
 Lavalier
 Lawn cloth
 Layered clothing
 Layered hair
 Layette
 Le Smoking
 Leading strings
 Leather
 Leather helmet
 Leather jacket
 Leather skirt
 Lederhosen
 Leg warmer
 Leggings
 Legskin
 Lehenga Style Saree
 Lei (garland)
 Lèine bhàn
 Leisure suit
 Lensless glasses
 Letterman (sports)
 Liberty bodice
 Liberty spikes
 Lightweight Rucksack
 Lika cap
 Limerick lace
 Linen
 Linen clothes
 Lingerie
 Lingerie tape
 Lining (sewing)
 Liqui liqui
 Liripipe
 List of brassiere designs
 List of crochet stitches
 List of Han Chinese clothing
 List of headgear
 List of Korean clothing
 List of types of fur
 List of types of sartorial hijab
 List of World War II uniforms and clothing
 List of yarns for crochet and knitting
 Little black dress
 Little Lord Fauntleroy
 Livery
 Livery collar
 Llauto
 Lock ring
 Lock stitch
 Locking clothing
 Loculus (satchel)
 Loden cape
 Loincloth
 Lolita fashion
 London Fashion Week
 Long hair
 Long-sleeved T-shirt
 Long underwear
 Longcloth
 Longyi
 Lookbook
 Loom
 Loose socks
 Lopapeysa
 Lord Anthony
 Lorgnette
 Lotus shoes
 Love beads
 Low cut sock
 Low-rise jeans
 Luckenbooth brooch
 Lugade
 Luhkka
 Lungi
 Lurex (yarn)
 Lusekofte
 Lux Style Award
 Lyocell

M 

 M-1941 Field Jacket
 M-1951 field jacket
 M-1965 field jacket
 M42 jacket
 M43 field cap
 MA-1 bomber jacket
 MA-2 bomber jacket
 Macaroni (fashion)
 Mackinaw cloth
 Mackintosh
 Macramé
 Made to measure
 Madiba shirt
 Madisar
 Madras (cloth)
 Madras (costume)
 Magnetic boots
 Magoja
 Mahiole
 Mail (armour)
 Maillot
 Makarapa
 Malaysian batik
 Malaysian cultural outfits
 Malaysian school uniform
 Male bra
 Malong
 Mandarin collar
 Mandarin square
 Mangalsutra
 Manggeon
 MANGO Fashion Awards
 Mandilion
 Manila shawl
 Manillas
 Maniple (vestment)
 Manta (dress)
 Mantelletta
 Mantilla
 Mantle (clothing)
 Mantle (vesture)
 Mantua (clothing)
 Mantyhose
 Mao suit
 Māori traditional textiles
 Marcasite jewellery
 Marcelling
 Maria Clara gown
 Maroon beret
 Mask
 Mary Jane (shoe)
 Matchy-Matchy
 Matelassé
 Maternity clothing
 Matron's badge
 Mawashi
 Maxi dress
 Maya textiles
 Mechanical watch
 Mechlin lace
 Medical bag
 Medical gloves
 Medical identification tag
 Medicine bag
 Medieval jewelry
 Mekhela chador
 Men's skirts
 Mengu (Japanese facial armour)
 Mercerised cotton
 Merino
 Mesh
 Mess dress
 Mess jacket
 Messenger bag
 Metal corset
 Metallic fiber
 Mexican pointy boots
 Microfiber
 Microskirt
 Midriff
 Milan Fashion Week
 Military beret
 Minaudière
 Miner's apron
 Miner's cap
 Miner's habit
 Ming official headwear
 Mining helmet
 Miniskirt
 Miniver
 Mink
 Mirrored sunglasses
 Misanga
 Mitre
 Mitznefet (Israeli military)
 Mixed martial arts clothing
 Mob cap
 Mobile phone charm
 Moccasin
 Mockado
 Mod (subculture)
 Modacrylic
 Modern dress
 Modern girl
 Modern Irish Army uniform
 Modius (headdress)
 Mohair
 Mohra (necklace)
 Moire (fabric)
 Mojari
 Mohawk hairstyle
 Moleskin
 Money bag
 Money belt
 Money clip
 Monk's cloth
 Monk shoe
 Monkey jacket
 Monmouth cap
 Monocle
 Monokini
 Montefortino helmet
 Montenegrin cap
 Montera
 Montera picona
 Moon Boot
 Mooskappe
 Mordant
 Morion (helmet)
 Morning dress
 Morocco leather
 Morphsuits
 Mother Hubbard dress
 Motley
 Motorcycle boot
 Motoring hood
 Mountaineering boot
 Mounteere Cap
 Mourning
 Muff (handwarmer)
 Mufti (dress)
 Mukluk
 Mule (footwear)
 Mullet (haircut)
 Multi-Terrain Pattern
 Mundu
 Mundum Neriyathum
 Muscadin
 Mushanana
 Muslin
 Muu-muu
 Myeonbok
 Myeonje baegab
 Mysore Peta

N 

 Nabedrennik
 Naga shawl
 Nainsook
 Nakshi kantha
 Namaksin
 Namba (clothing)
 Nambawi
 Nankeen
 Nanofiber
 Nantucket Reds
 Nap (textile)
 Napa leather
 Nasal helmet
 National costumes of Poland
 Nationella dräkten
 Native American jewelry
 Natural dye
 Naturism
 Natural fiber
 Nazi chic
 NBA dress code
 Neck corset
 Neck gaiter
 Neck ring
 Neckerchief
 Necklace
 Neckline
 Necktie
 Neckwear
 Needlepoint
 Negligee
 Nehru jacket
 Neiman Marcus Fashion Award
 Nemes
 Neoprene
 Net (textile)
 Netela
 New bespoke movement
 New Year's glasses
 New York Fashion Week
 Newsboy cap
 Nightcap (garment)
 Nightgown
 Nightshirt
 Ninon
 Niqāb
 Niqāb in Egypt
 Noil
 Nón quai thao
 Nonwoven fabric
 Norigae
 Norfolk jacket
 Nose-jewel
 Nose piercing
 Nosegay
 Nubuck
 Nurse uniform
 Nurse's cap
 Nursing bra
 Nylon

O 

 Obi (martial arts)
 Obi (sash)
 Obi-ita
 Ochipok
 Ohaguro
 Oilskin
 Olefin fiber
 Omega chain
 Omophor
 One-piece swimsuit
 Onesie (jumpsuit)
 Onnara
 Opanak
 Open-crotch pants
 Open drawers
 Opera coat
 Opinga
 Orarion
 Orenburg shawl
 Organ shoes
 Organdy
 Organic clothing
 Organic cotton
 Organza
 Ostrich leather
 Ottoman (textile)
 Ottoman clothing
 Outerwear
 Oven glove
 Over-the-knee boot
 Overall
 Overcoat
 Overfrock
 Overskirt
 Oxford (cloth)
 Oxford bags
 Oxford shoe

P 

 Paambadam
 Paduasoy
 Paduka
 Paenula
 Pageboy
 Pahlavi hat
 Pagri (turban)
 Paisley (design)
 Paithani
 Pajamas
 Pakistani clothing
 Pakol
 Palazzo trousers
 Palestinian costumes
 Palla (garment)
 Pallium
 Paludamentum
 Pampootie
 Panama hat
 Pangi (Maroon)
 Panling Lanshan
 Pannier (clothing)
 Pantalettes
 Panties
 Pants
 Pantsuit
 Panty line
 Pantyhose
 Pantyhose for men
 Papakhi
 Papal fanon
 Papal shoes
 Papal Slippers
 Papal tiara
 Paper clothing
 Papoose
 Parachute pants
 Paranja
 Pareo
 Paris Fashion Week
 Party dress
 Party hat
 Parure
 Pas kontuszowy (sash)
 Pasapali Sari
 Pashmina
 Pashtun dress
 Pasiking
 Passementerie
 Pasties
 Patchwork
 Patent leather
 Patiala salwar
 Patrol cap
 Patten (shoe)
 Pattern grading
 Pattern (sewing)
 Pattu pavadai
 Pea coat
 Peaked cap
 Pectoral (Ancient Egypt)
 Pectoral cross
 Pedal pushers
 Peep-toe shoe
 Peineta (comb)
 Pelisse
 Pelvic protector
 Pencil skirt
 Pencil suit
 Pendilia
 Peplos
 Peplum
 Peplum jacket
 Perak (headdress)
 Peranakan beaded slippers
 Percale
 Persian clothing
 Persian embroidery
 Persian weave
 Personal Clothing System
 Personal protective equipment
 Peshawari chappal
 Petasos
 Peter Pan collar
 Petersham ribbon
 Petite size
 Petticoat
 Petticoat breeches
 Pettipants
 Phat pants
 Phelonion
 Pheta (turban)
 Phoenix crown
 Phra Kiao
 Phrygian cap
 Phrygian type helmet
 Phulkari
 Physical training uniform
 Piccadill
 Picot
 Pien Fu
 Pigtail
 Pile (textile)
 Pile weave
 Pileus (hat)
 Pilgrim's hat
 Pill (textile)
 Pillbox hat
 Pima cotton
 Pin-back button
 Pin stripes
 Piña
 Pinafore
 Pince-nez
 Pinking shears
 Piping (sewing)
 Piqué (weaving)
 Pith helmet
 Pixie cut
 Placket
 Plague doctor costume
 Plaid (pattern)
 Plain dress
 Plain weave
 Plastic clothing
 Plastic pants
 Plate armour
 Platform boot
 Platform shoe
 Playsuit (children's clothing)
 Playsuit (lingerie)
 Pleat
 Pledge pin
 Plimsoll shoe
 Plus fours
 Plus-size clothing
 Plush
 Po (clothing)
 Pocket
 Pocket protector
 Pocket watch
 Podvorotnichok
 Poet shirt
 Point de Venise
 Pointe shoe
 Pointed hat
 Pointed shoe
 Pointinini
 Poke bonnet
 Polar fleece
 Police duty belt
 Police uniforms and equipment in the United Kingdom
 Political t-shirt
 Political uniform
 Polka dot
 Pollera
 Polo neck
 Polo shirt
 Polonaise (clothing)
 Polos
 Polyester
 Polypropylene
 Pom-pon
 Pompadour (hairstyle)
 Poncho
 Pongee
 Pontifical vestments
 Ponytail
 Poodle skirt
 Poplin
 Pork pie hat
 Portmanteau (luggage)
 Possum-skin cloak
 POW bracelet
 Power dressing
 Prairie skirt
 Pram suit
 Pratt knot
 Prayer shawl
 Preppy
 Presidential sash
 Priestly robe (Judaism)
 Priestly sash
 Priestly tunic
 Priestly turban
 Priestly undergarments
 Prince Albert piercing
 Princess seams
 Printed T-shirt
 Printer's hat
 Prison uniform
 Privilège du blanc
 Provence
 Pteruges
 Pudding hat
 Puletasi
 Puneri Pagadi
 Pungcha
 Purdah
 Purse
 Purse hook
 Puttee

Q 

 Qeleshe
 Qing official headwear
 Quadrille dress
 Queue (hairstyle)
 Quiff
 Quilting
 Quoit (brooch)

R 

 Rabbit hair
 Raccoon coat
 Racing flat
 Raffia palm
 Raglan sleeve
 Rah-rah skirt
 Rain pants
 Raincoat
 Raj pattern
 Rajshahi silk
 Rakusu
 Rally cap
 Ramie
 Randoseru
 Rash guard
 Rastacap
 Rationale (clothing)
 Rawhide (textile)
 Rayadillo
 Rayon
 Ready-to-wear
 Rebozo
 Recycling
 Red beret
 Red carpet fashion
 Red coat (British army)
 Red Sea rig
 Redingote
 Redresseur corset
 Reimiro
 Rekel
 Religious attire
 Religious clothing
 Religious habit
 Resist dyeing
 Resort wear
 Reticella
 Revers
 Reversible garment
 Rhinegraves
 Rhinestone
 Ribbing (knitting)
 Ribbon
 Ribbon work
 Rickrack
 Riding boot
 Riding habit
 Riding Mac Fashion
 Rigger boot
 Right to clothing
 Riha (garment)
 Rimless eyeglasses
 Ring (jewellery)
 Ring size
 Ringer T-shirt
 Ringlet (haircut)
 Ripstop
 Roach (headdress)
 Robe
 Robe de style
 Rochet
 Rocker bottom shoe
 Rogatywka
 Roller printing on textiles
 Roller shoes
 Roller skate
 Romanian dress
 Romper suit
 Rondel (armour)
 Rosemount Ski Boots
 Royal Air Force uniform
 Royal Navy uniform
 Ruby slippers
 Ruana
 Rubber glove
 Rubber pants
 Ruff (clothing)
 Ruffle (sewing)
 Rugby shirt
 Rugby shorts
 Rugby socks
 Rumāl
 Running shorts
 Ruqun
 Russian boot

S 

 Sabaton
 Sable
 Sabot (shoe)
 Sabretache
 Sack-back gown
 Saddle shoe
 Saekdongot
 Safari jacket
 Safari suit
 Sagging (fashion)
 Sagum
 Sagyusam
 Sailcloth
 Sailor cap
 Sailor suit
 Šajkača
 Sakkos
 Salako
 Salakot
 Sallet
 Saltwater sandals
 Sam Browne belt
 Sambalpuri saree
 Samite
 Sampot
 Sampot Samloy
 Samue
 Sanbenito
 Sandal
 Sanforization
 Sangu (armour)
 Sans-culottes
 Santa suit
 Sarafan
 Saran (plastic)
 Sari
 Sarong
 Sarpech
 Sash
 Satchel (bag)
 Sateen
 Satin
 Satin weave
 Satlada
 Sauna suit
 Savile Row
 Sbai
 Scapular
 Scarf
 School uniform
 School uniforms in England
 School uniforms in Sri Lanka
 Scissors-glasses
 Scogger
 Scoop neck
 Scrambled egg (uniform)
 Screen printing
 Scrimmage vest
 Scrubs (clothing)
 Scrum cap
 Scrunchie
 Sea silk
 Seaboot
 See-through clothing
 Seersucker
 Sehra
 Selburose
 Self-fabric
 Selvage
 Semi-formal
 Senegalese kaftan
 Senninbari
 Sennit
 Senufo Bird
 Sequin
 Serape
 Serbian national costume
 Serge
 Sericin
 Set-saree
 Setesdalsbunad
 Sgian-dubh
 Shadbelly
 Shagreen
 Shahmina
 Shahtoosh
 Shako
 Shalwar kameez
 Shalu (sari)
 Shahmina
 Shank (footwear)
 Sharkskin
 Sharovary
 Shawl
 Shearling
 Shearling coat
 Sheath dress
 Sheepskin
 Sheepskin boots
 Sheer fabric
 Sheitel
 Shell cordovan
 Shell gorget
 Shell jacket
 Shell stitch
 Shendyt
 Shenyi
 Sherwani
 Shetland wool
 Shingle bob
 Shinobi shōzoku
 Shiraro
 Shirizaya
 Shirring
 Shirt
 Shirt stays
 Shirt stud
 Shirtdress
 Shisha (embroidery)
 Shitagi
 Shmarjet
 Shoe
 Shoe buckle
 Shoe size
 Shoe tree
 Shoehorn
 Shoelace knot
 Shoelaces
 Shoemaking
 Shorts
 Shot silk
 Shoulder pads (fashion)
 Shoulder strap
 Shower cap
 Shpitzel
 Shrug (clothing)
 Shtreimel
 Shutter Shades
 Šibenik cap
 Side cap
 Sign language glove
 Sikh chola
 Silambu
 Silhouette
 Silk
 Simar
 Sindhi cap
 Single-breasted
 Sirwal
 Sisal
 Size zero
 Skate shoes
 Skeleton suit
 Ski boot
 Ski helmet
 Ski suit
 Skirt
 Skort
 Skufia
 Slap bracelet
 Sleeve
 Sleeve garter
 Sleeved blanket
 Sleeveless shirt
 Slide (footwear)
 Slim-fit pants
 Sling bag
 Slingback
 Slip (clothing)
 Slip-on shoe
 Slipper
 Slouch hat
 Slouch socks
 Small knot
 Smart casual
 Smock-frock
 Smock Parachutist DPM
 Smocking
 Smoking cap
 Smoking jacket
 Snap fastener
 Snapback (hat)
 Sneakers (footwear)
 Snood (headgear)
 Snow boot
 Snowmobile suit
 Snowshoe
 Social impact of thong underwear
 Sock
 Sokutai
 Sombrero
 Sombrero calañés
 Sombrero cordobés
 Sombrero de catite
 Sombrero Vueltiao
 Sonepuri Sari
 Song official headwear
 Songket
 Songkok
 Soutache
 South American fashion
 Spaghetti strap
 Spandex
 Spangenhelm
 Spanish breeches
 Spats (footwear)
 Spectator shoe
 Speedsuit
 Spencer (clothing)
 Spinning (textiles)
 Splittermuster
 Spodik
 Spool heel
 Spoon busk
 Sporran
 Sport coat
 Sports bra
 Sports visor
 Sportswear (activewear)
 Sportswear (fashion)
 Sprang
 Spur
 Square academic cap
 Square leg suit
 St. Tropez belt
 Stab vest
 The Stackhat
 Starter jacket
 Station wear
 Steek
 Steel-toe boot
 Stetson
 Sticharion
 Stiletto heel
 Stirrup pants
 Stock tie
 Stocking
 Stola
 Stole (shawl)
 Stole (vestment)
 Stomacher
 Stormy Kromer cap
 Strap
 Strapless dress
 Straw
 Straw hat
 Street fashion
 String bag
 Stripweave
 Stroller (style)
 Student boilersuit
 Student cap
 Stump sock
 Style line
 Style tribe
 Šubara
 Subligaculum
 Suea khrui
 Suede
 Suit (clothing)
 Sumptuary law
 Sun hat
 Sundress
 Sunglasses
 Supermodel
 Surcingle belt
 Surcoat
 Surplice
 Surtout
 Suspenders
 Sustainable fashion
 Swaddling
 Sweater
 Sweater design
 Sweater girl
 Sweater vest
 Sweatpants
 Swedish goggles
 Swedish Military Uniform
 Swim briefs
 Swim cap
 Swim diaper
 Swimsuit
 Synthesis (clothing)

T 

 T-bar sandal
 T-shirt
 T-skirt
 Ta'ovala
 Tabard
 Tabi
 Tactical pants
 Taffeta
 Tagelmust
 Tailcoat
 Tainia (costume)
 Takchita
 Tallit
 Tally (cap)
 Tam o' Shanter (cap)
 Tambour lace
 Tan beret
 Tang official headwear
 Tanga (clothing)
 Tanggeon
 Tangzhuang
 Tanker boot
 Tankini
 Tantour
 Tap pants
 Tapa cloth
 Tapestry crochet
 Tapis (Philippine clothing)
 Taqiyah (cap)
 Taranga (clothing)
 Tartan
 Tassel
 Tatami (Japanese armour)
 Tatting
 Tattooing
 Tau robe
 Tea gown
 Teddy (garment)
 Tēfui
 Telnyashka
 Telogreika
 Tembel hat
 Temple garment
 Temple ring
 Temple robes
 Teneriffe lace
 Tengura
 Tent dress
 Terrycloth
 Textile printing
 Textiles and dresses of Assam
 Thaar
 Thai fisherman pants
 Thali necklace
 Thawb
 Théâtre de la Mode
 Thigh-high boots
 Third jersey
 Thong
 Thracian clothing
 Thread count
 Three quarter pants
 Throwback uniform
 Tiara
 Tichel
 Tie chain
 Tie clip
 Tie-dye
 Tie pin
 Tiger-head shoes
 Tigerstripe
 Tight trousers
 Tightlacing
 Tights
 Tignon
 Tilfi
 Tilmàtli
 Timeline of clothing and textiles technology
 Tippet
 Titovka (cap)
 Tobi trousers
 Toe cleavage
 Toe tights
 Toe socks
 Toego
 Toga
 Toile
 Tokin (headwear)
 Tønder lace
 Tonsure
 Top (clothing)
 Top hat
 Topee
 Topi (cap)
 Topi (disambiguation)
 Topor (headgear)
 Toque
 Torc
 Torchon lace
 Torsolette
 Tote bag
 Toupée
 Toupha
 Trabea
 Tracht
 Track spikes
 Tracksuit
 Trading jacket
 Traditional Albanian clothing
 Traditional dyes of the Scottish Highlands
 Traditional Welsh costume
 Train (clothing)
 Training bra
 Training corset
 Traje de flamenca
 Traje de luces
 Trapper (ice hockey)
 Trashion
 Travel pack
 Tregging
 Trench boot
 Trench coat
 Tressoir
 Trews
 Tricana poveira
 Tricorne
 Triglavka
 Trilby
 Trim (sewing)
 Troentorp Clogs
 Trousers
 Trucker hat
 Trunks (clothing)
 Tsarouhi
 Tsujigahana
 Tsunokakushi
 Tube top
 Tubeteika
 Tudong
 Tudor bonnet
 Tulle bi telli
 Tulle netting
 Tunic
 Tunica molesta
 Tunicle
 Tunisian crochet
 Tupenu
 Tuque
 Turban
 Turkish trousers
 Turnshoe
 Tussar
 Tuxedo
 Tweed (cloth)
 Twill
 Twinset
 Type 07
 Type 97 Service Dress
 Tyrolean hat
 Tzitzit

U 

 Ugg boots
 Uchi-bukuro
 UK Lingerie Awards
 Ukrainian embroidery
 Ukrainian wreath
 Ulster coat
 Ultra sheer
 Ultrasuede
 Umbrella
 Umbrella Hat
 Undergarment
 Underpants
 Undershirt
 Underwear as outerwear
 Underwire bra
 Uniform
 Uniform (gymnastics)
 Uniform beret
 Uniforms of La Grande Armée
 Uniforms of the American Civil War
 Uniforms of the Confederate States military forces
 Uniforms of the Singapore Police Force
 Union suit
 Unisex clothing
 Unit Colour Patch
 Unitard
 Updo
 Upturned collar
 US standard clothing size
 Usekh collar
 Ushanka
 Utility clothing
 Utility cover
 Uttariya
 Uwa-obi
 Uwabaki
 Uwagi

V 

 Valenciennes lace
 Valenki
 Vambrace
 Vanity sizing
 Vat dye
 Veil
 Veilkini
 Velcro
 Veldskoen
 Velour
 Velvet
 Velveteen
 Venetian style shoe
 Vent (tailoring)
 Vest
 Vestment
 Vibram FiveFingers
 Victorian dress reform
 Victorian fashion
 Vicuña
 Vietnamese clothing
 Virago sleeve
 Viscose
 Visor
 Vista All Terrain Pattern
 Viyella
 Vo Phuc
 Voile
 Vyshyvanka

W 

 Waders (footwear)
 Waxed jacket
 Waist (clothing)
 Waist cincher
 Waistcoat
 Waistline (clothing)
 Walk shorts
 Wallet
 War bonnet
 Waraji
 Wardrobe (clothing)
 Warp knitting
 Warp printing
 Warp (weaving)
 Wasp waist
 Watch
 Water polo cap
 Water shoe
 Webbed belt
 Wearable art
 Wearable technology
 Weaving
 Wedding dress
 Wedding sari
 Weft
 Weighted silk
 Wellington boot
 Welsh hat
 Welt (shoe)
 Western cosmetics in the 1970s
 Western wear
 Wetsuit
 Wetsuit boots
 Whale tail
 Whipcord
 White coat
 White tie
 Wide leg jeans
 Wig
 Wild silk
 Willy warmer
 Wimple
 Windbreaker
 Windproof smock
 Windsor knot
 Windsor uniform
 Wine country casual
 Wings (haircut)
 Winklepicker
 Woggle
 Women wearing pants
 Women's clothing in China
 Women's oversized fashion in the United States since the 1920s
 Wonju (Bhutan)
 Wonsam
 Woodblock printing on textiles
 Wool
 Wörishofer
 World War II German uniform
 Worsted
 Woven fabric
 Wrap (clothing)
 Wrap dress
 Wrapper (clothing)
 Wreath (attire)
 Wrestling shoe
 Wrestling singlet
 Wristband

X 

 Xhaqete

Y 

 Yak lace
 Yanggwan
 Yarn
 Yashmak
 Yếm
 Yoga pants
 Yoke (clothing)
 Yuanlingshan
 Yukata

Z 

 Zardozi
 Zari
 Zazou
 Zentai
 Zephyr (garment)
 Zephyr cloth
 Zephyrina Jupon
 Zhiduo (clothing)
 Zibellino
 Zierscheibe
 Zipper
 Zone (vestment)
 Zonnar
 Zoot suit
 Zōri
 Zoster (costume)
 Zouave
 Zouave jacket
 Zucchetto
 Żupan
 Zuria

See also 
 List of grands couturiers

 
Fashion topics